Popover is a type of dress originally designed by Claire McCardell in 1942. The outfit type became the basis for a variety of wrap-around dresses.

A versatile wrap dress, it could be used as a bathing suit cover-up, house dress, dressing gown, or party dress. It is iconic of the American Look and could be worn to entertain, to a party, or to cover up a swimsuit.

References

Further reading
Works of art MET Museum for an example of the dress.
The 1940s by Robert Sickels pages 88, 238
The Little Black Dress and Zoot Suits: Depression and Wartime Fashions by Alison Behnke pages 45, 54

1940s fashion
1942 clothing
Dresses
Fashion terminology